The Linge-class tugboats are a series of tugboats used by the Royal Netherlands Navy to dock their larger ships at the Nieuwe Haven Naval Base.

History 
The first four ships were built by Shipyard Bijlsma and Delta shipyard in The Netherlands and commissioned in the year 1987. Ten years later another ship, the Gouwe, was built by these shipyards and commissioned in 1997.

As an avocation to their main purpose they are used for trips with guests around the harbour.

Replacement 

The first four ships would eventually be sold to MTS Towage in Brixham and Falmouth in the United Kingdom.

Ships in class

Namesakes 
All the ships are named after rivers with five letters ending with an e in The Netherlands:
 HNLMS Linge's namesake is: Linge
 HNLMS Regge's namesake is: Regge
 HNLMS Hunze's namesake is: Hunze
 HNLMS Rotte's namesake is: Rotte
 HNLMS Gouwe's namesake is: Gouwe

Notes

Citations

References 
 

Tugboats of the Royal Netherlands Navy